Naval Base Woodlark Island was a United States Navy base built during World War II on Woodlark Island on Papua New Guinea. The US Navy built a PT boat base, boat repair depot, and harbor facilities at the city of Guasopa to support the Pacific War in 1943. The Harbor facilities was also built to support the US Navy in building the Narewa Airfield on the island. The base was part of the New Guinea campaign.

History
On June 21, 1943, American forces came ashore on southern New Georgia, and then on June 30, landed on Woodlark Island as part of Operation Chronicle. Guasopa Bay lacked a usable dock so the landing were done with LST landing ships. Landing with the United States Army and United States Marine Corps at Guasopa was the US Navy's Seabee 60th Construction Battalion, and the 20th Construction. The 500 men with the 60th Construction Battalion started work on the airfield and its facilities. The 200 men with the 20th Construction Battalion started work on the harbor, barracks, mess halls, roads, water plant and other services.

At Guasopa Bay Harbor at pontoon pier was built. The PT boat base, and boat repair depot was completed. A sawmill was built to supply lumber for the harbor and airfield needs. A coral quarry was built to build roads, walkways and runways.

Airfield construction started on July 2, after 12 days a 3,000-foot fighter plane runway was completed. On September 15, the runway was lengthened to 6,500-feet and bomber began use of the runway. The airfield was called Narewa Airfield, but also called Woodlark Island Airfield and Guasopa Airfield. After the war, the airfield became Guasopa Airport.

Japan had airbases close enough that there were some bombings at Guasopa during construction. The bombings caused minor damage and no casualties to the construction crews.

All construction was completed on November 1, 1943, and the most Seabees depart Naval Base Woodlark Island. A maintenance crew of 309 men with the 60th Battalion stay at Naval Base Woodlark Island until March 1944.

Naval Base Woodlark Island Feet Post Office, FPO# is 528 SF Woodlark Island.

See also

 US Naval Advance Bases
Naval Base Port Moresby
Naval Base Milne Bay
US Naval Base New Guinea

Gallery

References

External links
youtube, Battle for New Guinea 1942-1945 

Naval Base Woodlark Island
Naval Stations of the United States Navy
World War II airfields in the Pacific Ocean Theater
Airfields of the United States Navy
Military installations closed in the 1940s
Closed installations of the United States Navy